Aaron "Little Tiger" Wade (March 17, 1916 – February 15, 1985) was an American Middleweight boxer who fought from 1935 to 1950.  Wade was a member of the famed Black Murderer's Row.

Early life

Born in Trenton Tennessee Wade became the first African American golden gloves champion in Peoria, Illinois and reportedly had 600 or more amateur fights.  Aarons older brother Bruce "Big Tiger" Wade was also a professional boxer, albeit a less successful one than his younger brother. Aaron stood a hair above 5 feet 5 inches and began his career at 140 lbs before moving up and competing at welterweight, middleweight, and light heavyweight

Career

Aaron Wade's fights with other members of black murderer's row are 3 losses to Charley Burley, 1 win over Herbert Lewis "Cocoa Kid" Hardwick, 2 losses and 1 draw to Jack Chase, and a win over Bert Lytell.  Other notable fights of Wade's career include a win over Archie Moore, a win against Sam Baroudi, 3 wins against Oakland Billy Smith, a loss to Ceferino Garcia, and a loss in his final career fight after a 2-year layoff against the great Sugar Ray Robinson. Like all the black murderer's row fighters, Wade never got a shot at the world title.  Aaron Wade finished his career with a record of 64(32KOs)-16-6.

Wade was a sparring partner of Sugar Ray Robinson's in 1948.  According to a Boston Post article Wade got into a fight with Sugar Ray over Wade's payment.  Wade left Sugar Ray with separation of his ribs and swelling described as "the size of a pullet egg" around his heart.  Robinson had to cancel his scheduled fight and was out for the next two months.

Authur Springs Toledo uncovered evidence that Wade took a dive in the bout against Sugar Ray Robinson.  According to Wade's son Robinson was unaware of the fix with the promoters being the culprits, paying Wade a few hundred dollars to lose the fight.  According to the Savannah Evening Press Wade "Began hitting the canvas for apparently no reason at all."

Later years

After his career ended, Wade descended into alcoholism but later overcame it and devoted his life to helping the less fortunate in the Fillmore section of San Francisco as a Christian minister. Wade died of a heart attack on February 15 of 1985. He was 68 years old

Professional boxing record

References

External links

1916 births
1985 deaths
Middleweight boxers
Place of birth missing
American male boxers